Magdalena Jaltepec  is a town and municipality in Oaxaca in southwestern Mexico. The municipality covers an area of 184.99 km². It is part of the Nochixtlán District in the southeast of the Mixteca Region.

As of 2005, the municipality had a total population of 3463.

The community's 16th-century church boasts a number of colonial-era polychrome and other santos (statues of Roman Catholic saints).

See also
Jaltepec River
Jaltepec Mixe

References

Municipalities of Oaxaca